Sărmașu massacre refers to the torture and massacre of 165 people, primarily Jews, committed by Hungarian paramilitaries in Sărmașu, Cluj-Turda County.

After Romania left the Axis Powers and joined the Allies during World War II, between 5 September and 10 October 1944, Sărmașu came under the occupation of the Nazi-aligned Hungarian troops. During this period, Hungarian gendarmes and members of the Hungarian National Guard, led by captain of gendarmes Lánczos László, killed 126 local Jews (out of 142 who were living in the city at the time), as well as 39 Romanians, the latter primarily prisoners of war captured in the battles on the alignment of Oarba de Mureș–Luduș–Gheja–Chețani, during the Battle of Turda.

The massacre 

Hungarian population in the area, who supported the cause of Hungary, in the desire to regain the whole of Transylvania, started, along with the Hungarian Guard, to loot houses of Jews and Romanians. On 9 September 1944, a team of Hungarian gendarmes took up from their homes several Romanians that had important functions in the administration of the commune. These people were taken to an improvised camp in Sărmașu and were tortured for several days. According to the sentence handed down on 28 June 1946 by the People's Tribunal in Cluj, "in the camp was applied an inhumane treatment, consisting of beatings, ill-treatments and executions staged at night. For example, once all Romanians were removed from the camp in the yard, put on their knees («At the church»), and, after this exercise, everyone, regardless of age, was forced to overturn until exhaustion". In the afternoon of 16 September, those 126 Jews in the improvised camp were transported with carriages to a place called Suscut, and in the night of 16/17 September were killed by Hungarian gendarmes and soldiers. The bodies of those killed (31 adult males, 52 adult females and 43 children up to age 15) were exhumed from two mass graves in February 1945. The conclusion reached by the Medico-legal commission who conducted the autopsy of the cadavers was violent death by shooting, and, in the case of several children, violent death by asphyxiation, those ones being buried alive.

On 15 September 1944, some Romanians were released, and 18 others were deported to Hungary. They were taken by truck to Cluj, where they were rounded up and forced to march, escorted by civilian police, on the way to Jibou and then to Budapest. One of the deported and declared dead was Iuliu Moldovan, father of actor Ovidiu Iuliu Moldovan. Likewise, father Micu, a priest almost 80 years old, was killed. The number of all Romanians deported who lost their lives is not known exactly.

Sentence of People's Tribunal in Cluj 
Investigations against those responsible for the massacres of Sărmașu and Luduș started in 1945 and ended in 1946. By sentence of the Cluj Tribunal was established the responsibility for the Sărmașu massacre: two officers of the gendarmerie troops (captain Láncz László, lieutenant Vecsey) and five NCOs (second lieutenant Halasz, second lieutenant Fekete, sergeant major Szabo, sergeant Horváth István, and sergeant Polgár) were found guilty and were sentenced to death. Two locals were sentenced to imprisonment for participation in the massacre: János Pánczél (soldier-gendarme from Sărmașu) and István Soós (member of the Hungarian Civil Guard in Sărmașu) were sentenced to 20 years and 5 years in prison.

See also 
 Ip massacre
 Luduș massacre
 Treznea massacre
 List of massacres in Romania

References

External links

Massacres in 1944
September 1944 events
October 1944 events
The Holocaust in Romania
20th century in Transylvania
Massacres in Romania
Mass murder in 1944
1944 murders in Romania
Hungary–Romania relations
Ethnic cleansing in Europe